The Mixed Board-a-Match Teams is a bridge competition held at the summer American Contract Bridge League (ACBL) North American Bridge Championship (NABC).

From 2010 the event is officially the Freeman Mixed Board-a-Match Teams, as it is contested for the Richard Freeman Memorial Trophy, named for Richard Freeman (1933–2009). This is the fourth trophy in play, following Lebhar, Barclay, and Chicago.

The event is a board-a-match team event. 
The event typically last 2–3 days with each day being a round consisting of two sessions of 26 boards. 
The event is open.

History

The Mixed Teams championship is one of the oldest ACBL events, first played in 1929. It is a four-session event with two qualifying and two final sessions. At one time it was restricted to players with at least 100 masterpoints (thus the name to 1995, "Master Mixed Teams") but now is an open event.

It was originally known as the Master Mixed Teams. In 1996, the name changed to the present designation. From 1946 to 1955, a separate event with national rating was held on the West Coast.

The winners have their names inscribed on the Chicago Trophy.

Winners

At least four champion Mixed Teams defended their titles successfully and without change in personnel, in 1944, 1950, 1953, and 1978. The 1977–78 winners finished in a 3-way tie in 1979.

Charles Goren won the event six times from 1938 to 1954 and Helen Sobel six times from 1941 to 1968, five times as teammates.

West Coast interlude

From 1946 to 1955, a separate event with national rating was held on the West Coast.

References

Other sources

 List of previous winners, Pages 18, 19. 

 2008 winners, Page 1. 

 "Search Results: Freeman Mixed BAM Teams". 1929 to present. ACBL. Visit "NABC Winners"; select a Summer NABC. Retrieved 2014-06-04. 

North American Bridge Championships
Contract bridge mixed pairs